Kamal ad-Din (Kamāl ad-Dīn) is a male Muslim given name or surname (laqab in Arabic), meaning "perfection of the religion" in Arabic.

The name is formed from the elements kamāl, al-, and dīn. It is often transliterated as Kamāl al-Dīn, but because the letter dāl (d) is a sun letter, the lām (l) of al- assimilates into the first letter of dīn in pronunciation, resulting in a doubled consonant.

In Classical Arabic the pronunciation of the name changes depending on its function. Thus, the nominative case of the name is Kamaluddin (Kamālu’d-Dīn), the accusative case is Kamaladdin (Kamāla’d-Dīn), and the genitive case is Kamaliddin (Kamāli’d-Dīn).

People
Kamal al-Din ibn al-Humam (d. 861/1457), Hanafi Maturidi scholar
Kamal al-Din al-Bayadi (d. 1078/1687), Ottoman Hanafi Maturidi scholar
Kamal al-Din ibn al-Adim (1192–1262), Arab historian
Kamal al-Din Gurg (died 1315), Delhi Sultanate general
Kamāl al-Dīn al-Fārisī (1267-1318), Persian physicist and mathematician
Kamaleddin Khojandi, or Kamal Khujandi (–1400), Persian poet
Kamal al-Din Muhammad ibn Musa Al-Damiri (1344–1405), Egyptian writer on canon law and natural history
Kamal ud-Din of Sulu (reigned 1480–1505), Sultan of Sulu
Kamāl ud-Dīn Behzād (1450–1535), painter of Persian miniatures
Ahmed Kemaleddin, known as Kemal Reis (1451–1511), Turkish privateer and Ottoman admiral
Mimar Kemaleddin Bey (1870-1927), Turkish architect
Khwaja Kamal-ud-Din (1870–1932), Indian lawyer and religious writer
Prince Kamal el Dine Hussein (1874–1932), son of Sultan Hussein Kamel of Egypt
Kemalettin Sami Gökçen (1882-1934), officer of the Ottoman Army and general of the Turkish Army
Kamaloddin Jenab (1908-2006), Iranian physicist
Kamal el-Din Hussein (1921-1999), one of the Egyptian Free Officers who overthrew King Farouk
Kamaluddin Muhamad, later known as Keris Mas, (1922 - 1992), Malaysian writer
Kamal al-Din al-Nabhani (1929-2006), Lebanese religious leader and politician
Kamaluddin Ahmed (born 1930), Indian politician
Kamaluddin Ahmed (physicist) (1939-2014), Pakistani physicist
Mohammed Hasan Kamaluddin (born 1941), Bahraini politician, diplomat, poet and historian
Kamal Uddin Siddiqui (born 1945), Bangladeshi scientist and economist
Kamaluddin Mohammed (born 1957), Malayali Indian film director
Kamaladdin Heydarov (born 1961), Azerbaijani composer and politician
Kamaluddin Azfar, Pakistani politician (PPP)
Kemalettin Şentürk (born 1970), Turkish footballer
Kamalludin Kasimbekov (born 1977), Uzbek held in Guantanamo
Kamalutdin Akhmedov (born 1986), Russian footballer
Kamal Uddin (politician), Pakistani politician (MMA)
Kamolidin Tashiyev (born 2000), Kyrgyzstani footballer

Arabic masculine given names